Calling Dr. Luv is the third studio album by American industrial band The Electric Hellfire Club, released on September 3, 1996, by Cleopatra Records. The album is named after the Kiss song "Calling Dr. Love" and after their keyboardist The Rev. Dr. Luv who had recently died, which the album was dedicated to.

Track listing

References

1996 albums
The Electric Hellfire Club albums
Cleopatra Records albums